Jay K. Edward Foulston (born 27 November 2000) is a Welsh professional football player who plays as defender for Taunton Town.

Career
Foulston was a product of the Newport County academy and was promoted to the first team squad in July 2017 following appearances in Newport's pre-season friendly matches.

He made his senior debut at 16 years old for Newport County on August 8, 2017 in a Football League Cup first round match versus Southend United, during which he entered into play as a late second-half substitute. Newport won the game 2–0. His debut aged 16 years 08 months and 12 days made him the third youngest ever County player, behind Regan Poole and Steve Aizlewood

On 16 April 2018, he signed his first professional contract at Newport until June 2020. On 10 January 2019, he joined Merthyr Town on loan until the end of the 2018–19 season. On 11 July 2019, he joined Chippenham Town on loan until the end of the 2019-20 season. 

He was released by Newport County at the end of the 2019-20 season. On August 24, 2020 he was signed on free transfer from Newport County to Taunton Town.

International
In March 2018, Foulston was called up to the Wales under 19 squad for two friendly international matches against Croatia.

References

External links

Living people
2000 births
Welsh footballers
Association football defenders
Footballers from Swansea
Newport County A.F.C. players
Merthyr Town F.C. players
Chippenham Town F.C. players
National League (English football) players
Southern Football League players